The Women’s Memorial March is an annual event which occurs on February 14 in remembrance and in honour of the lives of missing and murdered indigenous women. This event is also a protest against class disparity, racism, inequality and violence. The event was originated and is held in Vancouver’s Downtown East Side. The March begins on the corner of Main and Hastings and proceeds through downtown, stopping outside of bars, strip clubs, in alley ways and parking lots where women’s bodies have been found. Each woman’s name is read along with who she is a daughter to, or a mother of before the family and supporters pause to grieve.

The Women's Memorial March stands for survival and resilience and symbolizes the reclamation of dignity that has been denied the most marginalized women in Canada. Another important role of this movement is the restoration of public discourses in media. To reshape certain labels, representations, categorizations, and stereotypes of Indigenous women in Vancouver's Downtown Eastside used to excuse ignorance and discrimination from the police and the public.

Dara Culhane emphasizes a quote from a flyer distributed at the Women's Memorial March in 2001 in the beginning of her essay Their Spirits Live Within Us: Aboriginal Women in Downtown Eastside Vancouver Emerging into Visibility,"WE ARE ABORIGINAL WOMEN. GIVERS OF LIFE. WE ARE MOTHERS, SISTERS, DAUGHTERS, AUNTIES AND GRANDMOTHERS. NOT JUST PROSTITUTES AND DRUG ADDICTS. NOT WELFARE CHEATS. WE STAND ON OUR MOTHER EARTH AND WE DEMAND RESPECT. WE ARE NOT THERE TO BE BEATEN, ABUSED, MURDERED, IGNORED."

Origins of the March 
On January 20, 1991, a woman, whose name is not spoken out of consideration for her family, was found murdered on Powell Street in Vancouver's Downtown Eastside. On February 14, 1991, her mother Linda Ann Joe and family and several others gathered in that spot to grieve their loss. This grassroots event, started by Linda Ann Joe and other women living in this area, brought the community together to show compassion and recognition for all Indigenous women in the Downtown Eastside and to honour the missing and murdered.

The Women's Memorial March now draws thousands of people in Vancouver every year and has grown as a movement, spreading to other provinces in Canada. Many cities across Canada now stage similar events to honour and bring visibility to missing and murdered indigenous women in their communities.

Each year, Vancouver organizers have published a list of names of the women and girls who have been murdered or remain missing in the Downtown Eastside. In the time since the first march in 1992, more than 970 names have been added to this list with 75 new names from 2019 alone.

Violence against Aboriginal women in Canada
By the year 2009, close to 67,000 Aboriginal women who were aged 15 and above reported being subjected to violence within the previous 12 months.  About 63% of these were aged 15 to 34 years old.  76% of the incidents reported were non-spousal violence and were not reported to police, as is the case with incidents of violence against Aboriginal women.  Although many of these crimes against Aboriginal women were not reported to police or other service organizations, such as shelters, etc., 98% of women victimized told an informal source such as a friend or family member.

Police response 
In Canada, Indigenous women constitute 4% of the female population and 16% of female murders.

In 2014, the RCMP reported that more than 1,200 indigenous women were missing or had been found murdered in the last 25 years, while Indigenous Women's Groups proclaimed this number to be over 4,000. This discrepancy between numbers is due to a lack of evidence and attention given by authorities.

Between 1983 and 2003, more than 61 women were filed as  "missing persons" from Vancouver's Downtown Eastside and over half were indigenous women. As families and friends tried to draw authorities attention to the matter, Philip Owen, who was the mayor of Vancouver from 1993 to 2002, refused to offer a reward or further investigate the missing women and stated that he believed public funds should not be used to create a "location service for prostitutes."

Culhane states that authorities used categorizations of Indigenous women as related to sex, drugs, crime, violence, murder and disease as excuses to ignore and take little action into investigating the root of these disappearances. The justification was that these women inflicted this harm on themselves by living in the Downtown Eastside and living the lifestyles that they did. Vancouver's Missing Women became a public issue as more women disappeared. Academics, advocates, journalists and the women's families came together. It became publicly recognized that a serial killer may be active in this neighbourhood in 1999.

Public discourse and the media 
In the immediate post-war years, violence experienced by indigenous women in Canada was kept out of mainstream public discourse, it wasn't until the 1960s that these incidences were given attention in the media. News stories rationalized the violence by focussing on poverty, disease, crime, and sex work in the Downtown Eastside. The photos of the victims used in the media were often mug shots from previous arrests presenting these women as criminals. In her article, Indigenous Women as Newspaper Representations: Violence and Action in 1960s Vancouver, Meghan Longstaffe says that Media outlets used racist and stereotypical language which reinforced negative representations of Indigenous Women. In her theses, You Will Be Punished: Media Depictions of Missing and Murdered Indigenous Women, Caitlin Elliot observes a pattern where reporters sensationalized and made a spectacle of the injustices which were occurring with undue focus on crime while avoiding topics of sex and race prejudice and colonialism.

The use of tropes and stereotypes has been a tactic of settler colonialism since before the 19th Century. Negative tropes regarding Indigenous femininity, sexuality, and motherhood pit Indigenous and white women against each other and protect white men from punishment and accountability for abuse against Indigenous women. The “Skid Road Girl” was a trope that appeared in the media as the experiences of Indigenous women faced in Vancouver's Downtown Eastside became more publicly recognized. Due to the surplus of single men, drug use, and crime in the area, "skid road" became a commonly used symbol of the Downtown Eastside. The "Skid Road Girl" referred to women living in this neighbourhood and came with negative connotations referring to poverty, addiction, violence, and corruption. According to Caitlin Elliot, these categorizations informed the idea that violence was a natural consequence of living in this area and victims were at fault for their own suffering.

According to Meghan Longstaffe, Vancouver journalists "combined postwar discourses about "skid road" with stereotypes about Indigenous women to create a specifically female version of this narrative." Headlines such as "Skid Road 'Killed My Girls'" and "Where Were You Going, Little One? Bubble of City Glamor Burst in Bundle of Death" characterized victims as young and helpless. Vancouver Sun Journalist Simma Holt used statements such as, "[She] was drunk, just another cut and bruised Indian girl, and nobody took much interest in the complaint" and "The way she died is typical and so common, society has accepted it just as it does minor traffic accidents." In an attempt to bring awareness to the inaction of the Police, the language used in these reports normalized the violence Indigenous women were experiencing and allowed the public to turn a blind eye to the matter. In Dara Culhane’s words, “The annual Valentine’s Day Women’s Memorial March gives political expression to a complex process through which Aboriginal women here are struggling to change the language, metaphors, and images through which they come to be (re)known as they emerge into public visibility."

Case studies
Some specific cases which illustrate the depth of the problem of violence against aboriginal women in Canada were highlighted in a report by Amnesty International in 2004. They include the murder of 19-year-old Helen Betty Osborne who was killed November 12, 1971, after a night out with friends in The Pas, Manitoba, a town of 6,000 which was segregated between Indigenous and non-indigenous Canadians.  She was accosted by four non-indigenous men at 2 a.m. while walking back to her house.  Osborne refused to have sex with the men, and was then forced into their car where she was beaten and sexually assaulted.  She was then taken to a local cabin, beaten some more and stabbed to death.

The police who were assigned to the case failed to act on specific tips that pointed to the four likely perpetrators.  The car that was used during the crime was not searched until a year later (1972).  By 1972, police concluded that they didn't have enough evidence for the case.  Only twenty years later did the Manitoba Justice Inquiry conclude that the murder was indeed fueled by racism and sexism.  Charges were eventually brought in October 1986 when new evidence was released.  Dwayne Johnson was found guilty in 1987 and sentenced to life in prison.  Among the other men, one was acquitted and the others never charged.

An example of the perceived indifference to the disappearance of Indigenous women is seen in the case of Shirley Lonethunder, a Cree woman from the White Bear First Nations reserve in Saskatchewan who was last seen by family in December 1991.  At the time, she was a 25-year-old mother of two. She was a drug user and occasionally worked in the sex trade, according to family members. The family became aware that she was missing in March 1992, when Lonethunder's attorney contacted them to say she had missed a court date. According to Lonethunder's relatives, Saskatoon police investigators showed little interest in the case. Six months after filing a missing person report for his sister, Lonethunder's brother contacted the police to ask about progress on the case, only to be told they had no record of the report.

Robert Pickton case 
In 1978 the RCMP and the Vancouver Police Department Missing Women Task Force joined forces to organize a list of missing women from the Downtown East Side. By 2002 this list accounted for at least 65 women. In 1992 when the first Women's Memorial March took place and families were demanding thorough investigations into their missing loved ones, the Vancouver police refused to concede that there may be a serial killer preying on the Downtown East Side despite the frequent disappearances, mostly because no bodies had been found.

In March 1997 a woman escaped Robert Pickton's farm and was taken to Royal Columbian Hospital in New Westminster. Pickton was a part owner of his families pig farm in Port Coquitlam, British Columbia. Pickton ended up in the same hospital for injuries the women inflicted in self defence and the key for the handcuffs around the woman's wrists was found in Picktons pocket. He was charged with attempted murder, assault with a weapon, and forcible confinement, all of which were eventually dropped. The woman, whom Pickton claimed to be a hitchhiker that assaulted him, was shown to be an incompetent witness because of a drug addiction.

Many workers and friends of Pickton's made reports to the police of suspicious behaviour, sightings of women's belongings on the farm and even a woman's body spotted in the slaughterhouse. None of these reports came from a first hand witness thereby disabling the police from obtaining a search warrant. Finally in February 2002 Pickton was arrested for a weapons charge allowing the police to conduct a search warrant on his farm. This search revealed human remains and other evidence connecting him to 26 of the missing women from the Downtown Eastside.

In February 2002 Robert Pickton was charged with the murders of 26 of the women listed by the Missing Women Task Force. Pickton often came to the Downtown East Side to dispose of waste and used the opportunity to offer women money or drugs to lure them into his car and take them to his farm. In a conversation with an undercover RCMP officer in his cell, he admitted to murdering 49 women and wanting to make it an even 50. Due to a lack of evidence and attention, however, many of the disappearances were not officially connected to Pickton. Many of the women went missing unnoticed. Sherry Rail who disappeared in 1984 was not reported missing until 1987 when a team was initiated by the RCMP to investigate unsolved cases of sex trade workers. This team made little progress and was dissolved in 1989.

The provincial government initiated an inquiry into the case in 2012 which concluded that this "tragedy of epic proportions" was caused by "blatant failures" of the police. Failures surrounding incompetent criminal investigative work constituted by prejudice against sex trade workers and Indigenous women. The Pickton case brought public awareness to the ongoing issue of missing and murdered Indigenous women and girls in Canada, as many of his victims were Indigenous women. A national government inquiry was initiated in 2016.

History in the Downtown Eastside 
Vancouver's Downtown Eastside is one of Canadas poorest neighbourhoods. The Indigenous population makes up 2% of Vancouver as a whole and 10% of the Downtown Eastside. Despite the large numbers of missing and murdered women from this neighbourhood, Meghan Longstaffe says, "The historical processes that shaped this neighbourhood's social location and the experiences of the women and girls who lived there, however, remain poorly understood."

Vancouver's Eastside has historically been a destination for immigrant, working class families and migrant workers. In the 20th Century, this area was largely populated by loggers, miners, fishers, railway workers and other single male labourers who resided in cheap hotels and boarding rooms. Due to categorizations of this area as working class, and dominantly masculine, the Downtown Eastside was deemed, as Longstaffe writes, a zone of "immorality and physical decay."

In the 1950s, a rapid increase of Indigenous migrants began to join the Coast Salish peoples of British Columbia from across North America. This pivotal migration was due to various circumstances in northern and reserve communities concerning economic and social inequity and dislocation. Longstaffe says,"Multiple factors, including the impacts of residential schools, colonial land and resource policies, technological developments, changes to subsistence and capitalist economies, and growing populations contributed to overcrowding, housing shortages, unemployment, poverty, welfare dependency, alcohol addiction, and poor health."As a result, many Indigenous men and women moved from reserve communities into city centres. The city provided better social and health services in cases of refuge from violence, employment opportunities and in some cases government-sponsored relocation programs.

These conditions were compounded by the provisions of colonial legislation. According to the Indian Act, for example, Indigenous women who married men who did not have legal Indian status were refused their own status, along with that of their "illegitimate" children's. Before 1985 when the Indian Act was amended, thousands of women without legal status lost their band membership and their right to live on reserves, and were forced to move to city centres.

See also
Wendy Poole Park
Highway of Tears murders
Finding Dawn

References

External links
Missing and Murdered Aboriginal Women:  A National Operational Overview (Royal Canadian Mounted Police)

Amnesty International: Stolen Sisters
Fact Sheet: Missing and Murdered Aboriginal Women and Girls (Native Women’s Association of Canada)
Missing and Murdered Aboriginal Women and Girls: Understanding the Numbers (Amnesty International)

Events in Vancouver
Recurring events established in 1992
Indigenous culture in Canada
Indigenous health in Canada
Women's organizations based in Canada
Violence against Indigenous women in Canada
1992 establishments in British Columbia
Protest marches
Feminist protests
Downtown Eastside
Annual events in Canada
Women's marches
Missing and Murdered Indigenous Women and Girls movement